Orientalium Ecclesiarum, subtitled the Decree on the Eastern Catholic Churches is one of the Second Vatican Council's 16 magisterial documents. "Orientalium Ecclesiarum" is Latin for "of the Eastern Churches," and is taken from the first line of the decree. 

One of the shortest conciliar documents, it was approved on 20 November 1964 by a vote of 2,054 in favour and 64 opposed, and was confirmed by a vote of 2,110 to 39 on 21 November 1964, the day when it was promulgated by Pope Paul VI. 

The decree recognizes the right of Eastern Catholics to keep their own distinct liturgical practices while remaining in full communion with the Holy See. The decree exhorts Eastern Catholics to "take steps to return to their ancestral traditions." This aspect of the decree was directed against Latinisation.

The document specifies some of the autonomous powers of the Eastern Churches. In particular, the Patriarch (or where applicable, major archbishop) and synod have the power to establish eparchies, to nominate bishops within their patriarchate, to legislate the rights and obligations of the minor orders (including subdiaconate), and to determine the date for celebrating Easter within their rite. It furthermore recognized the ancient practice in the East regarding the sacrament of confirmation (Chrismation), stating that all Eastern priests have the power to administer this sacrament using chrism blessed by a bishop. One of the implications of this is the further practice of infant communion was formally recognized.

Contents
There are 30 articles, divided into 6 chapters, plus a preamble and a conclusion.

The Preamble affirms the Church's respect for Eastern Catholics (§1):

The Catholic Church holds in high esteem the institutions, liturgical rites, ecclesiastical traditions and the established standards of the Christian life of the Eastern Churches, for in them, distinguished as they are for their venerable antiquity, there remains conspicuous the tradition that has been handed down from the Apostles through the Fathers and that forms part of the divinely revealed and undivided heritage of the universal Church. 

The Individual Churches or Rites

- “Each individual Church or Rite should retain its traditions whole and entire” but “should adapt its way of life to the different needs of time and place” (§2)

- The individual Churches, whether Eastern or Western, are of equal dignity (§3)

- Every Catholic must retain his own rite, cherish and protect it (§4)

Preservation of the Spiritual Heritage of the Eastern Churches

- “The Churches of the East, as much as those of the West, have a full right and are in duty bound to rule themselves, each in accordance with its own established disciplines” (§5)

- All Eastern Churches may preserve their liturgical traditions and way of life, and if history has imposed changes on them, “they should take steps to return to their ancestral traditions” (§6)

Eastern Rite Patriarchs

- “The patriarchate, as an institution, has existed in the Church from the earliest times” (§7)

- All patriarchs are of equal dignity (§8)

- The rights and privileges of patriarchs “should be re-established in accordance with the ancient tradition of each of the Churches and the decrees of the ecumenical councils” (§9)

- “The patriarchs with their synods are the highest authority for all business of the patriarchate”, subject to the Pope's right to intervene in individual cases (§9)

- New patriarchates should be established where there is a need (§11)

The discipline of the Sacraments (§12-18) is concerned with the regulation of the sacraments. An important issue is the right of priests of one rite to administer sacraments to faithful of another rite. It also recommends that the diaconate be restored as a permanent ministry.

Divine Worship (§19-23) deals with the regulation of such liturgical matters as feast days (including Easter), the Divine Office and the languages to be used in the liturgy. 

Relations with the Brethren of the Separated Churches

- Eastern Catholics have a special duty to promote Christian unity, especially with the Eastern Orthodox (§24)

- If a member of an Eastern Orthodox Church becomes Catholic, “no more should be required of him than what a bare profession of the Catholic faith demands”. An Orthodox priest or bishop is permitted to act as a priest or bishop upon joining the Catholic Church (§25)

- A member of an Eastern Orthodox Church, if he asks of his own accord, may receive the sacraments of Penance, Eucharist and Anointing of the sick from an Eastern Catholic priest. And an Eastern Catholic, if no Catholic priest is available, may receive these sacraments from an Eastern Orthodox priest. Eastern Catholics and Eastern Orthodox may take part in each other's liturgical services (§26-29)

The Conclusion (§30) asks all Christians, Eastern and Western, to pray for the reunion of Christians, and also to pray for those Christians suffering for their faith in Christ (a reference to Christians in communist countries).

References

Sources

External links

 The English text of the decree can be found on the Vatican website

Documents of the Second Vatican Council
History of Eastern Catholicism
1964 documents
1964 in Christianity